This is the discography of Statik Selektah.

Albums

Studio albums

Collaborative albums

Extended plays

As a lead artist

References

 
Hip hop discographies